Chronomyrmex is an extinct genus of ants of the subfamily Dolichoderinae. The genus only contains a single species Chronomyrmex medicinehatensis, discovered in Canada and described in 2013.

References

†
Monotypic fossil ant genera
Hymenoptera of North America
Fossil taxa described in 2013
Late Cretaceous insects
Canadian amber
Taxa named by Michael S. Engel